The women's 4 × 200 metre freestyle relay competition of the swimming events at the 1991 Pan American Games took place on 12 August. The last Pan American Games champion was the United States.

This race consisted of sixteen lengths of the pool. Each of the four swimmers completed four lengths of the pool. The first swimmer had to touch the wall before the second could leave the starting block.

Results
All times are in minutes and seconds.

Heats

Final 
The final was held on August 12.

References

Swimming at the 1991 Pan American Games
Pan